Sachaa Jhutha (English: "Honest and Liar") is a 1970 Indian Hindi action comedy film directed by Manmohan Desai and produced by Vinod Doshi. The film written by Desai's wife Jeevanprabha, was edited by Kamlakar Kamkhanis. The film starring Rajesh Khanna, Mumtaz, Vinod Khanna revolves around  a simple villager (Bhola), who has a lookalike, a crook (Ranjeet Kumar), who takes advantage of the former's simplicity and mirror-image (both the roles of Bhola and Ranjeet Kumar were played by Rajesh Khanna). The music of the film was composed by Kalyanji-Anandji.

The film was the second highest grosser of the year and was declared a super hit. The performance of Rajesh Khanna was critically acclaimed and he won the Filmfare Best Actor Award for 1971. Being  a box office blockbuster, it is counted among the 17 consecutive hit films of Rajesh Khanna between 1969 and 1971, by adding the two-hero films Marayada and Andaz to the 15 consecutive solo hits he gave from 1969 to 1971.

Plot
Bhola (Rajesh Khanna) is an innocent band musician who lives with his physically challenged sister Belu (Kumari Naaz) in a village. He needs more money for his sister's marriage and he sets off to Bombay to earn. To make his sister not feel sad for his departure, he sings a song on the way towards the railway station. On the other hand, Bombay city Police department is shocked by a series of diamond thefts which leave no clue. But Inspector Pradhan (Vinod Khanna) suspects the thief to be Ranjeet Kumar (also Rajesh Khanna), who is actually a wealthy diamond businessman, on the account that whenever a theft occurs, he is present there. But he has no evidence and searches for that. He creates a plan with Leena (Mumtaz) to attract Ranjeet and to know his secret plans. Bhola arrives in the city and he is called Ranjeet in a party. Ranjeet, who arrives at the party later, is surprised to see Bhola, as he looks identical to him. He immediately conceives a plan. He takes Bhola to his place and reveals himself. He convinces Bhola to act like Ranjeet in front of society as he is suffering from cancer and requires treatment. Until his return from treatment, Bhola has to make trust with everybody that he is Ranjeet. Actually, Ranjeet makes him himself so that he can continue with his diamond smuggling, meanwhile, there will not be any evidence, as Bhola is going to be Ranjeet everywhere. But he did not reveal the reason to him. He also promises that he would give money for his sister's marriage. Innocent Bhola believes him and agrees to the plan.

Ranjeet's girlfriend Ruby (Faryal) trains Bhola to be like Ranjeet and he acts like him. Bhola finally learns every mannerism of Ranjeet and at an instance, he behaves like Ranjeet to Ranjeet. He acts as Ranjeet in the city and the real Ranjeet continues his underground work of diamond smuggling and Inspector Pradhan cannot come to a conclusion. Leena moves intimately with Bhola thinking of him as Ranjeet, but Bhola falls in love with her. On the other side, in the village, due to heavy floods, Belu loses everything and comes in search of her brother to Bombay with her dog Moti. Bhola watches a marriage ceremony on the road and he imagines the bride to be his sister and sings the same song which he sang in the village. Belu, who hears that, runs after him, but Bhola has already left the place. Pradhan meets Belu and helps her to reach the place. Belu is misguided by some men regarding the whereabouts of her brother and tries to exploit her, but Pradhan saves her from them and takes her to his home. Ruby, who follows Belu to Pradhan's house informs Ranjeet about her. Ranjeet, posing like her brother, goes to Pradhan's home and takes her with him.

Bhola finds out Ranjeet is actually a thief and plans a grand diamond loot. Bhola resists the plan, but Ranjeet blackmails him with his sister. Unwillingly, he accepts the plan. Ranjeet steals a huge amount of diamonds, but Bhola replaces him by attacking him and leaves the place. One of the stolen diamond pieces has a transmitter and police follow the jewels with the help of it. Belu is confused as to who is her brother among them. After several fights, both Bhola and Ranjeet are arrested. Both of them claim themselves as Bhola and confuse everyone. Belu suggests that her brother play the song on a musical instrument which cannot be played by anyone else, but both play the same tune. Finally, Bhola and Belu's dog Moti identifies the real Bhola and Ranjeet is arrested and sent to prison. Belu finally marries Inspector Pradhan and Bhola marries Leena.

Cast
Rajesh Khanna as Bhola / Ranjeet Kumar (Double Role)
Mumtaz as CID Inspector Leena / Rita
Vinod Khanna as CID  Inspector Pradhan 
Naaz as Belu
Faryal as Ruby
Jagdish Raj as CID Inspector Jagdish 
Kamal Kapoor as Police Commissioner 
Dina Pathak as Pradhan's Mother

Soundtrack
The music, composed by Kalyanji-Anandji, with lyrics by Indivar, Gulshan Bawra and Qamar Jalalabadi, is a strong point of the film.

Remakes

Tamil
It was remade in Tamil as Ninaithadhai Mudippavan (Finishes everything he thinks), with M. G. Ramachandran reprising Rajesh Khanna's roles and M. N. Nambiar reprising Vinod Khanna's role, which was released in 1975.

The Tamil Film had some few scenes different from an original movie like:

 Ranjith in Hindi kills the doctor who has treated his gunshot wounds, whereas Ranjith in Tamil lets the doctor leave his place alive. Ranjith is portrayed only as a thief and not a murderer.
 In the final court scene, Ranjith is identified by Bhola's dog, whereas in Tamil version Ranjith convinces everybody that the dog is lying. He is finally trapped on seeing his mother lying dead and he reveals himself by exposing his love for his mother.
 Tamil version has a story as to why Ranjith has become a diamond thief, with a small flashback in his childhood, which is not in Hindi movie.

Kannada
The film was remade in Kannada as Mutthanna in (1994) starring Shiva Rajkumar in lead role.In Kannada. Scenes are same as Tamil movie.

Ranjit's character was renamed as Diamond Kiran and Bhola's character was renamed as Mutthanna.
In Kannada film it is shown that dimond kiran was living with his parents. Some goons comes and cheats his father because of thar tension his father dies from heartattack. Kiran grows up with his widow mother and he became a billionaire and wanted thief to fulfill revenge of his father's death.
 In Hindi movie the final court scene, Ranjith is identified by Bhola's dog, whereas in Tamil version Dimond Kiran convinces everybody that the dog is lying. He is finally trapped on seeing his mother lying dead and he reveals himself by exposing his love for his mother.

Awards
1970 Filmfare Best Actor Award for Rajesh Khanna.

References

External links

1970 films
1970s Hindi-language films
1970s action comedy films
Indian action comedy films
Films scored by Kalyanji Anandji
Hindi films remade in other languages
Films directed by Manmohan Desai
Films about dogs
Films about pets